Sam Pecqueur (born 26 August 1994) is a Scotland 7s international rugby union player. He plays for Edinburgh in the United Rugby Championship and Heriots in the Super 6. Pecqueur's primary position is wing.

Rugby Union career

Professional career 

Pecqueur signed for Edinburgh in the summer of 2019.

He signed for Southern Knights in 2021.

He switched to play for Heriots in 2022.

International career

Pecqueur played his first match for the Scotland national rugby sevens team in the 2017 South Africa Sevens tournament.

References

1994 births
Living people
Rugby union players from Edinburgh
Edinburgh Rugby players
Rugby union wings
Melrose RFC players
Heriot's RC players
Scotland international rugby sevens players